The Gadsden Independent School District (GISD) is a New Mexico school district headquartered in Sunland Park. Gadsden ISD's superintendent is currently Travis Dempsey who was appointed by the board of education after Efren Yturralde's resignation June 2017. The school district is named for James Gadsden.

As of 2015 it has 14,200 students.

Cities and Towns
Cities and towns served by the district include the following:

In both Doña Ana County and Otero counties:
 Chaparral

In Doña Ana County:
 Anthony
 Berino
 Chamberino
 La Mesa
 La Union
 Mesquite
 San Miguel
 Santa Teresa
 Sunland Park
 Vado

Educational Facilities
Its educational facilities include the following:
 5 high schools (Gadsden High School, Santa Teresa High School, Chaparral High School, Desert Pride Academy (alternative school), and Alta Vista Early College High School)
 3 junior-high schools (Chaparral Middle School, Gadsden Middle School, Santa Teresa Middle School)
 16 elementary schools
 4 pre-Kindergarten schools
 1 administrative complex
 1 regional treatment hospital
 Gadsden ISD Warehouse

References

External links
Gadsden Independent School District

Education in Doña Ana County, New Mexico
Education in Otero County, New Mexico
School districts in New Mexico